Arts and letters may refer to:
Arts and letters, the literary arts ("letters") together with the fine arts and/or the performing arts
Arts and Letters, an American thoroughbred race horse 
 Arts & Letters, a literary journal based at Georgia College
 Arts & Letters Daily, a web portal owned by The Chronicle of Higher Education

See also
 American Academy of Arts and Letters
 College of Arts and Sciences, sometimes referred to as a College of Arts and Letters
 Ordre des Arts et des Lettres, a French honour given for contributions to the arts and/or literature
 Belles-lettres, literature valued for its aesthetic qualities

fr:Arts et Lettres